Colette Maze (born 16 June 1914) is a French pianist. In 2021, at age 107, she released an album with recordings of Debussy, making her one of the oldest recording pianists in the world.

Biography
Colette Maze was born on 16 June 1914 in Paris. Her father was the manager of a fertilizer plant and Maze was educated at home until she was a teenager. She studied at the École Normale de Musique de Paris when she was 15. Her teachers were Alfred Cortot and Nadia Boulanger. At 100, she still plays the piano, to maintain her memory, she says. Maze worked as a piano teacher. She has released six classical records, beginning in 1998. Her fourth was in 2017, and was dedicated to Claude Debussy. In 2021, at the age of 107, she released a sixth album.

Discography

Sources

External links

1914 births
20th-century French women pianists
21st-century French women pianists
French centenarians
Living people
Musicians from Paris
Women centenarians